The Higer Yujun (御骏) is a midsize pickup manufactured by Chinese automotive brand Higer. Higer is a brand under Higer Bus, a subsidiary of the King Long Group, which is the largest bus maker in China.

Overview

Launched in 2011, the Higer Longwei midsize pickup was built on the same platform as the Isuzu D-Max, available with four engine options, including a 2.2 liter four-cylinder petrol engine, a 2.4 liter four-cylinder diesel engine, and two 2.8 liter four-cylinder turbo-diesel engines, all mated to a five-speed manual gearbox. The standard layout is rear wheel drive, and four-wheel drive is optional. Prices of the Higer Yujun starts at 71,800 yuan and ends at 92,800 yuan.

The Higer Yujun also bears a resemblance to the Holden Colorado RC styling-wise, which was sold from 2009 to 2012.

References

External links
  (Higer)

Pickup trucks
Rear-wheel-drive vehicles
Trucks of China
2010s cars